Combtooth blennies are blenniiformids; percomorph marine fish of the family Blenniidae, part of the order Blenniiformes. They are the largest family of blennies with around 401 known species in 58 genera. Combtooth blennies are found in tropical and subtropical waters in the Atlantic, Pacific and Indian Oceans; some species are also found in brackish and even freshwater environments.

Description

The body plan of the combtooth blennies is archetypal to all other blennioids; their blunt heads and eyes are large, with large continuous dorsal fins (which may have three to 17 spines). Their bodies are compressed, elongated, and scaleless; their small, slender pelvic fins (which are absent in only two species) are situated before their enlarged pectoral fins, and their tail fins are rounded. As their name would suggest, combtooth blennies are noted for the comb-like teeth lining their jaws.

By far the largest species is the eel-like hairtail blenny at 53 cm in length; most other members of the family are much smaller. Combtooth blennies are active and often highly colourful, making them popular in the aquarium hobby.

Habitat and behaviour

Generally benthic fish, combtooth blennies spend much of their time on or near the bottom. They may inhabit the rocky crevices of reefs, burrows in sandy or muddy substrates, or even empty shells. Generally found in shallow waters, some combtooth blennies are capable of leaving the water for short periods during low tide, aided by their large pectoral fins which act as "feet". Small benthic crustaceans, mollusks, and other sessile invertebrates are the primary food items for most species; others eat algae or plankton.

One exceptional group of combtooth blennies deserves special mention: the so-called sabre-toothed blennies of the genera Aspidontus, Meiacanthus, Petroscirtes, Plagiotremus, and Xiphasia. These blennies have fang-like teeth with venom glands at their bases. Species of the genera Aspidontus and Plagiotremus (such as the false cleanerfish) are noted for their cunning mimicry of cleaner wrasses: by imitating the latter's colour, form, and behaviour, the blennies are able to trick other fish (or even divers) into letting down their guard, long enough for the blennies to nip a quick mouthful of skin or scale.

Some combtooth blennies form small groups, while others are solitary and territorial. They may be either diurnal or nocturnal, depending on the species. Females lay eggs in shells or under rock ledges; males guard the nest of eggs until hatching. 

In some species, the eggs may remain in the oviduct of the female until hatched. The fry of some species undergo an 'ophioblennius' stage, wherein the fish are pelagic (i.e., inhabiting the midwater) and have greatly enlarged pectoral fins and hooked teeth.

Classification

This family is currently divided into two subfamilies and approximately 58 genera and 397 species.

The following genera are classified within the family Blenniidae:

 Subfamily Salarinae Gill, 1859
 Aidablennius Whitley, 1947
 Alloblennius Smith-Vaniz & Springer, 1971
 Alticus Lacepède, 1800
 Andamia Blyth, 1858
 Antennablennius Fowler, 1931
 Atrosalarias Whitley 1933
 Bathyblennius Bath, 1977
 Blenniella Reid, 1943
 Chalaroderma Norman, 1944
 Chasmodes Valenciennes, 1836
 Cirripectes Swainson, 1839
 Cirrisalarias Springer, 1976
 Coryphoblennius Norman, 1944
 Crossosalarias Smith-Vaniz & Springer, 1971
 Dodekablennos Springer & Spreitzer, 1978
 Ecsenius McCulloch, 1923
 Entomacrodus Gill, 1859
 Exallias Jordan & Evermann, 1905
 Glyptoparus J.L.B. Smith, 1959
 Hirculops J.L.B. Smith, 1959
 Hypleurochilus Gill, 1861
 Hypsoblennius Gill, 1861
 Istiblennius Whitley, 1943
 Lipophrys Gill, 1896
 Litobranchus Smith-Vaniz & Springer, 1971
 Lupinoblennius Herre, 1942
 Medusablennius Springer, 1966
 Microlipophrys Almada, Almada, Guillemaud & Wirtz, 2005
 Mimoblennius Smith-Vaniz & Springer, 1971
 Nannosalarias Smith-Vaniz & Springer, 1971
 Ophioblennius Gill, 1860
 Parablennius Miranda Ribeiro, 1915
 Parahypsos Bath, 1982
 Paralticus Springer & Williams, 1994
 Pereulixia J.L.B. Smith, 1959
 Praealticus Schultz & Chapman, 1960
 Rhabdoblennius Whitley, 1930
 Salaria Forsskål, 1775
 Salarias Cuvier, 1816
 Scartella Jordan, 1886
 Scartichthys Jordan & Evermann, 1898
 Stanulus J.L.B. Smith, 1959

 Subfamily Blenniinae Rafinesque, 1810
 Adelotremus Smith-Vaniz & Rose, 2012
 Aspidontus Cuvier, 1834
 Blennius Linnaeus, 1758
 Enchelyurus Peters, 1868
 Haptogenys Springer, 1972
 Laiphognathus J.L.B. Smith, 1955
 Meiacanthus Norman, 1944
 Oman Springer, 1985
 Omobranchus Valenciennes, 1836
 Omox Springer, 1972
 Parenchelyurus Springer, 1972
 Petroscirtes Rüppell, 1830
 Phenablennius Springer & Smith-Vaniz, 1972
 Plagiotremus Gill, 1865
 Spaniblennius Bath & Wirtz, 1989
 Xiphasia'' Swainson. 1839

Timeline

See also

 List of fish common names
 List of fish families

References
 

Blenniiformes
Taxa named by Constantine Samuel Rafinesque
Articles which contain graphical timelines